Steve Toltz (born 1972 in Sydney) is an Australian novelist.

Works
A Fraction of the Whole, his first novel, was released in 2008 to widespread critical acclaim. It is a comic novel which tells the history of a family of Australian outcasts. The narration of the novel alternates between Jasper Dean, a philosophical, idealistic boy, who grows up throughout the novel and his father, Martin Dean, a philosopher and shut-in described at the start of the novel as "the most hated man in all of Australia". This is in contrast with Terry Dean, Jasper's uncle, whom Jasper describes as "the most beloved man in all of Australia". The novel spans the entirety of Martin's life and several years after (a range never specified in the text, but starting after World War II and ending in the early 2000s), and is set in Australia, Paris, and Thailand.

The novel has repeatedly been compared favourably to John Kennedy Toole's Pulitzer Prize winning novel A Confederacy of Dunces. A Fraction of the Whole was shortlisted for the 2008 Man Booker Prize and the 2008 Guardian First Book Award.

His second novel, Quicksand, published in 2015, won the Russell Prize, while his third, Here Goes Nothing, was longlisted for the 2022 Nib Literary Award.

Bibliography 
 A Fraction of the Whole (2008)
 Quicksand (2015)
 Here Goes Nothing (2022)

Personal life
Toltz attended Killara High School and graduated from the University of Newcastle, New South Wales, in 1994. Prior to his literary career, he lived in Montreal, Vancouver, New York City, Barcelona, and Paris, variously working as a cameraman, telemarketer, security guard, private investigator, English teacher, and screenwriter.

Toltz married French-Australian artist and painter Marie Peter-Toltz in 2005. They have one son born in 2012.

References

External links

Steve Toltz Official Website
Bookbrowse Biography
A Fraction of the Whole and Quicksand – Reviews and review links

Writers from Sydney
Living people
1972 births
Australian male novelists